The Ministry of Economic Integration was an agency in the Government of Kazakhstan that existed from 2011 to 2016.

The Ministry was formed on 16 April 2011 as a separate body of Ministry of Economic Development and Trade in order to strengthen the interests of Kazakhstan in international and regional economic integration. The Ministry of Economic Integration was led by Zhanar Aitzhanova until she was appointed as the Ambassador of Kazakhstan to Switzerland in 11 May 2016.

References 

2011 establishments in Kazakhstan
Economic Integration
Ministries established in 2011